The Northern Rivers Symphony Orchestra is an Australian orchestra based in Murwillumbah, New South Wales.

The orchestra is the premier orchestra for the Gold Coast and Northern Rivers region. It was created in 1991 by Barry Singh, who remains the orchestra's artistic director and conductor and has featured on Australian Story on ABC Television.

Its performances take place in venues including:
 Queensland Performing Arts Centre (QPAC) Concert Hall
 Gold Coast Art Centre
 Seagulls, Tweed
 Tweed Civic Centre
 Empire Theatre, Toowoomba

The orchestra has performed with the Gold Coast City Ballet, Opera Queensland and Dragon Tenors.

External links
The Northern Rivers Symphony Orchestra

Musical groups established in 1991
Australian orchestras
Culture of New South Wales
1991 establishments in Australia